The GCR Class 8C was a class of a pair of 4-6-0 locomotives built for the Great Central Railway in 1903–1904 by Beyer, Peacock and Company. They passed to the London and North Eastern Railway at the 1923 grouping and received the classification B1 They were reclassified B18 in 1943 and both were retired in 1947.

Design
Two were built as a comparison with a two similar 4-4-2 locomotives (GCR Class 8B, later LNER class C4). The 4-4-2 locomotives were numbered 192 and 194, the 4-6-0s 195 and 196.

They were built with a saturated boiler, inside slide valves and Stephenson valve gear, two outside cylinders connected to  diameter driving wheels. No. 196 had  cylinders, while No. 195 has  cylinders.

While the 4-4-2 locomotive design was chosen as the superior design, and was repeated in quantity, the basic 8C design was sound and used as the basis of the Class 8F (later LNER Class B4), the main difference being smaller  driving wheels of  diameter.

Modifications
One (No. 195) had been fitted with a superheated boiler, 10-inch piston valves and 21-inch cylinders in 1912, but the boiler had been exchanged for a saturated one in 1920.

LNER ownership
The two locomotives were renumbered by the LNER by adding 5000 to their GCR numbers; and classified as B1.

The LNER designed a new type of superheated boiler (Diagram 16) based on the old design (Diagram 15). These were used on the B1 and B4 class locomotives; no more of this type of boiler was made after 1932, and so to keep the B1 and B4s in service during World War II, some Diagram 15 boilers were modified for use with these locomotives.

5195 received a Diagram 16 boiler in March 1926; while 5196 received its new boiler and had its cylinder diameter increased to 21-inches in April 1927

Their classification was changed to B18 in April 1943 to allow Thompson's B class to be reclassified as B1. They were renumbered 1479 and 1480 in 1946. Withdrawal came in December 1947, and both were scrapped.

References

4-6-0 locomotives
08C
Beyer, Peacock locomotives
Railway locomotives introduced in 1903
Scrapped locomotives
Standard gauge steam locomotives of Great Britain
2′C n2 locomotives
Passenger locomotives
 Great Central Railway 4-6-0s